John Plant (23 March 1871 – early 1950) was an English international footballer, who played as an outside left.

Early and personal life
Plant was born in Bollington, Cheshire on 23 March 1871. He was the eldest of four children. He worked as a labourer in an iron foundry. He married and had two daughters.

Career
Plant spent his early career playing with local clubs Denton and Bollington. He signed for Bury in 1890, and won the Football League Division Two title with Bury in 1894–95. He spent the 1898–99 season with Reading, before returning to Bury, where he finished his career in 1907. He was a member of Bury's FA Cup-winning teams in 1900 and 1903, scoring a goal in both finals.

He earned one cap for England in 1900.

Later life and death
By 1911 he was working as a labourer in a cotton mill. By 1939 he was a retired widower. He died in early 1950, aged 78.

References

1871 births
1950 deaths
People from Bollington
English footballers
England international footballers
Bury F.C. players
Reading F.C. players
English Football League players
Association football forwards
FA Cup Final players